Maya Cumming (born 2001), known professionally as MAY-A (stylised in all caps), is an Australian singer-songwriter from Sydney, New South Wales.

On 2 February 2022, Cumming was featured on the single "Say Nothing", a collaboration with Australian electronic musician and producer Flume.

Early life
May-a grew up in Sydney, but moved to Byron in 2010. She moved back to Sydney age 13. Whilst living in Byron Bay she competed in songwriting competitions, and performed street busking around the ages of 11 to 14. She started out posting videos on YouTube under the username Heyit'smaya.

Prior to discovering her attraction to women, May-a stated she was in a "super awkward" relationship with a boy that inspired her song "Apricots".

Career
May-A toured with Wafia and signed with Sony Music Australia in 2020.

Her debut EP, Don't Kiss Ur Friends, was released on 6 August 2021. The EP debuted at number 31 on the ARIA Charts.

In January 2023, May-A released "Sweat You Out My System".

May-a topped Triple J Hottest 100, 2022 with a feature on Australian musician Flume's song "Say Nothing".

Discography

Extended plays

Singles

As lead artist

As featured artist

Awards and nominations

APRA Awards
The APRA Awards are presented annually from 1982 by the Australasian Performing Right Association (APRA), "honouring composers and songwriters". They commenced in 1982.

! 
|-
| 2023
| "Say Nothing" (Flume featuring May-a)
| Song of the Year 
|  
| 
|-

ARIA Music Awards
The ARIA Music Awards is an annual ceremony presented by Australian Recording Industry Association (ARIA), which recognise excellence, innovation, and achievement across all genres of the music of Australia. They commenced in 1987.

! 
|-
| 2021|| Don't Kiss Ur Friends || Breakthrough Artist || 
| rowspan="1"| 
|-
| rowspan="3"| 2022
| rowspan="3"| "Say Nothing" (Flume featuring May-a)
| Best Pop Release
| 
| rowspan="3"| 
|-
| Song of the Year
| 
|-
| Best Video
| 
|-

J Awards
The J Awards are an annual series of Australian music awards that were established by the Australian Broadcasting Corporation's youth-focused radio station Triple J. They commenced in 2005.

! 
|-
| 2022
| "Say Nothing" by Flume featuring Maya (directed by Michael Hili)
| Australian Video of the Year
| 
|

Rolling Stone Australia Awards
The Rolling Stone Australia Awards are awarded annually in January or February by the Australian edition of Rolling Stone magazine for outstanding contributions to popular culture in the previous year.

! 
|-
| 2022
| May-a
| Best New Artist
| 
| 
|-

Vanda & Young Global Songwriting Competition
The Vanda & Young Global Songwriting Competition is an annual competition that "acknowledges great songwriting whilst supporting and raising money for Nordoff-Robbins" and is coordinated by Albert Music and APRA AMCOS. It commenced in 2009.

! 
|-
| 2021
| "Time I Love to Waste"
| Vanda & Young Global Songwriting Competition
| style="background:tan;"| 3rd
|
|-

References

2001 births
21st-century Australian women singers
Australian women pop singers
Living people
Sony Music Australia artists
Australian LGBT singers
Australian LGBT songwriters
People from Byron Bay, New South Wales